Três Passos Atlético Clube, commonly known as Três Passos, is a Brazilian football club based in Três Passos, Rio Grande do Sul state.

History
The club was founded on February 9, 1966. They won the Campeonato Gaúcho Third Level in 1969, beating Tupy.

Achievements
 Campeonato Gaúcho Third Level:
 Winners (1): 1969

Stadium
Três Passos Atlético Clube play their home games at Estádio Municipal Elias de Medeiros. The stadium has a maximum capacity of 3,000 people.

References

Association football clubs established in 1966
Football clubs in Rio Grande do Sul
1966 establishments in Brazil